Coleen Dufresne (born 15 February 1953) is a Canadian basketball player. She competed in the women's tournament at the 1976 Summer Olympics.

Awards and honors
Top 100 U Sports women's basketball Players of the Century (1920-2020).

References

1953 births
Living people
Basketball people from Nova Scotia
Canadian women's basketball players
Olympic basketball players of Canada
Basketball players at the 1976 Summer Olympics
Sportspeople from Halifax, Nova Scotia